Alfian Eko Prasetya (born 4 August 1994) is an Indonesian badminton player specializes in doubles, affiliated with Jaya Raya Jakarta badminton club. He was the mixed doubles gold medalist at the 2011 BWF World Junior Championships partnered with Gloria Emanuelle Widjaja. He won his first Grand Prix title at the 2014 New Zealand Open with Annisa Saufika.

Achievements

BWF World Junior Championships 
Mixed doubles

Asian Junior Championships 
Boys' doubles

BWF World Tour (1 title, 2 runners-up) 
The BWF World Tour, which was announced on 19 March 2017 and implemented in 2018, is a series of elite badminton tournaments sanctioned by the Badminton World Federation (BWF). The BWF World Tour is divided into levels of World Tour Finals, Super 1000, Super 750, Super 500, Super 300 (part of the HSBC World Tour), and the BWF Tour Super 100.

Mixed doubles

BWF Grand Prix (2 titles, 3 runners-up) 
The BWF Grand Prix had two levels, the Grand Prix and Grand Prix Gold. It was a series of badminton tournaments sanctioned by the Badminton World Federation (BWF) and played between 2007 and 2017.

Mixed doubles

  BWF Grand Prix Gold tournament
  BWF Grand Prix tournament

BWF International Challenge/Series (5 titles, 2 runners-up) 
Men's doubles

Mixed doubles

  BWF International Challenge tournament
  BWF International Series tournament

Performance timeline

National team 
 Junior level

 Senior level

Individual competitions

Junior level
 Boys' doubles

 Mixed doubles

Senior level

Men's doubles

Mixed doubles

Record against selected opponents 
Mixed doubles results with Annisa Saufika against World Superseries finalists, World Championship semi-finalists, and Olympic quarter-finalists.

  Xu Chen & Ma Jin 0–2
  Michael Fuchs & Birgit Michels 1–0
  Riky Widianto & Richi Puspita Dili 0–1

References

External links 
 

1994 births
Living people
Sportspeople from Jakarta
Indonesian male badminton players
21st-century Indonesian people